Miss Universe Myanmar 2022 is the 9th Miss Universe Myanmar pageant that was held in October 1, 2022 at the Grand Ballroom, Novotel Hotel, Yangon. Zar Li Moe of Bhamo won the competition, but didn't have a chance of being crowned by the reigning Miss Universe Myanmar, Thuzar Wint Lwin. She will represent Myanmar at Miss Universe 2022 in New Orleans Morial Convention Center in New Orleans, Louisiana in the United States.

Results 
 Color keys

§ - Voted into the Top 10 by voting.

Awards

Special awards

Pageant

Judges 
 Min That San – Fashion Designer (Sweet & Smart)
 Lin Lin – Actress & Make-up Artist
 Sharr Htut Eaindra – Miss Universe Myanmar 2014
 Htet Htet Htun – Miss Universe Myanmar 2016
 U Win Than – Chairman of Lucky Diamonds Myanmar
 Dr. Laurel – CEO & Founder of Pan Aesthetics Clinic
 Dr. Hsu Yee Aung Soe – Founder of Aesthetics Dentist - DSC Dental Specialist Clinic
 Zun Than Sin – Miss Universe Myanmar 2017
 Swe Zin Htet – Miss Universe Myanmar 2019

Contestants 
14 contestants competed in the pageant:

Withdrawals 

03 - Han Bo Bo withdrew due to some personal injuries.
10 - Ni Ni Lin Eain withdrew due to her mother's unstable health.

Crossovers and returnees 
Contestants who previously competed in previous editions of Miss Universe Myanmar and other local and international beauty pageants with their respective placements:

City pageants
Miss Burma Sittwe
2021: Soe Htet Nwe (Winner)

Miss Tourism and Culture Universe Bhamo
2020: Zar Li Moe (Winner)

Miss Golden Land Yangon Region
2019: Sasha Viola (Winner - Yangon (North))

National Pageants 

Miss Crystal Angel Teen Myanmar 
2019: Hsu Labb Thaddar (Winner)

Miss Myanmar International
2019: Ya Mone (2nd Runner-up)

Miss World Myanmar 
2019: Amara (1st Runner-up)
2018: Ya Mone (2nd Runner-up)

Miss Rainbow Ribbon 
2013: Myo Ko Ko San (Winner)

International Pageants 

Miss International Queen
2014: Myo Ko Ko San (Unplaced)

Notes

References

External links 
 Miss Universe Myanmar official website

2022 in Myanmar
Miss Universe Myanmar
2022 beauty pageants
Beauty pageants in Myanmar